Anthony Oluwakayode Oseyemi (born 17 January 1977), is a British–South African actor of Nigerian descent. He is best known for the roles in the films and teleserials Five Fingers for Marseilles, The Congo Murders and Isidingo. Apart from acting, he is also a writer, musician and producer.

Personal life
He was born on 17 January 1977 in the United Kingdom to a Nigerian family. Later he relocated to South Africa, where he received his BA degree in Performing Arts from the University of North London. He completed postgraduate studies in the UK. After the studies, he returned to South Africa and settled there.

Career
He started acting career on stage as part of Lewisham youth theatre. Then he made valuable performances at the riverside as part of the London International Festival of Theatre. He also performed at the Tricycle theatre and the Albany with Project Phakama. In the meantime, he played the lead role in the play The Amen Corner produced by James Baldwin. He also co-produced the play Performance with Multi media production where he also made a role. During this period, he also made guest roles in the television series such as ITV's The Bill (2003) and BBC's medical drama Holby City (2005).

From 2002 to 2003, he made a recurring role in the series Is Harry On The Boat? and in 2005, he played a guest role on the episode entitled "Viva Liberty" in the comedy series Coming Up telecast on Channel 4. After obtaining his Performing arts degree, he made the lead roles in many television serials including: Jacobs cross, Room 9, Traffick and Isidingo. He has also starred in the television serial, Wild at heart, The runaway, Strike back, and The Book of Negroes. In 2012, he made the appearance in an episode of the e.tv anthology series Mzansi Love: Ekasi Style.

In 2017, he played a lead role 'Congo' in the South African Western thriller film Five Fingers for Marseilles directed by Michael Matthews. It was later screened in the Discovery section at the 2017 Toronto International Film Festival and received critical acclaim. Meanwhile, he also starred in the romantic comedy Hectors Search for Happiness, and then in American direct-to-video action film SEAL Team 8: Behind Enemy Lines'.

Other than acting, he also wrote the South African television series Tempy Pushas telecast on SABC 1. Then he wrote the serial Room 9'' which gives him a South African Film and Television Awards Nomination in 2014 and also as a lead cast member.

Filmography

See also
 Survivor (franchise)

References

External links
 

Living people
1977 births
21st-century South African male actors
Black British male actors
British emigrants to South Africa
People from Alexandra, Gauteng
South African people of Nigerian descent
South African male film actors
South African male television actors